is a Japanese politician of the Liberal Democratic Party, a member of the House of Representatives in the Diet (national legislature). A native of Tochigi Prefecture and graduate of Waseda University, he was elected for the first time in 2005 after unsuccessful runs in 2000 and 2003.

References

External links 
  in Japanese.

Members of the House of Representatives (Japan)
Koizumi Children
Waseda University alumni
Politicians from Tochigi Prefecture
Living people
1955 births
Liberal Democratic Party (Japan) politicians
Japanese baseball players
Japanese sportsperson-politicians